The Gargoyle is the student newspaper of University College at the Canadian University of Toronto. It was named after the gargoyle statue in the college building, which was originally created by Frederick Cumberland in emulation of tenth century medieval architecture.

The Gargoyle was established in 1954 as the first regularly appearing student newspaper at University College.  Except for a hiatus between 1973 and 1977, when the University College Literary and Athletic Society lost its entire budget to an impersonator of its treasurer and the paper was forced to collapse, it has published continuously since 1954.

The Gargoyle is staffed by an editorial masthead of undergraduate students, as well as a group of staff and regular contributors.

The Gargoyle has taken many formats over the years. Formerly self-described as a "knee-jerk, left-wing, reactionary rag," it currently calls itself "University of Toronto's greasiest publication" and publishes opinions; arts and culture articles; science articles; poetry and prose; and comics, in addition to photography and visual art. The Gargoyle accepts contributions from all University of Toronto students, although the majority of contributors are from University College.

The Gargoyle was notable for its somewhat archaic production style. As opposed to most contemporary publications, The Gargoyle was, until 2008, laid out completely by hand, forsaking desktop publishing applications for scissors and glue. Issues were assembled on cardboard "flats", which were then physically transported to the printer. The Gargoyle has since shifted to a hybrid production style, in which most pages are still laid out by hand on paper but are then scanned and digitally modified. This shift of process has allowed for the possibility of online publication and resulted in the creation of the Gargoyle website in 2010.

See also
List of student newspapers in Canada
List of newspapers in Canada

References

External links
The Gargoyle official website

Student newspapers published in Ontario
Newspapers published in Toronto
Publications established in 1954
1954 establishments in Ontario
Biweekly newspapers published in Canada